The Euro Players Tour Championship 2010/2011 – Event 3 (also known as the 2010 Rhein–Main Masters and the 2010 Russelsheim Cup) was a professional minor-ranking snooker tournament that took place between 22–24 October 2010 at the Walter Kobel Sporthalle in Rüsselsheim, Germany.

Thanawat Thirapongpaiboon made the 74th official maximum break during his last 32 match against Barry Hawkins. At the age of 16 years and 312 days, he became the youngest player to have made an officially recognised maximum break in professional competition. Mark Williams made the 75th official maximum break during his last 128 match against Diana Schuler. This was Williams' second 147 break.

Marcus Campbell won in the final 4–0 against Liang Wenbo.

Prize fund and ranking points
The breakdown of prize money and ranking points of the event is shown below:

1 Only professional players can earn ranking points.
2 Prize money earned from the Plate competition does not qualify for inclusion in the Order of Merit.

Main draw

Top half

Section 1

Section 2

Section 3

Section 4

Bottom half

Section 5

Section 6

Section 7

Section 8

Finals

Century breaks

147  Thanawat Thirapongpaiboon
147  Mark Williams
142  Andrew Higginson
135, 116  Anthony Hamilton
133, 119, 107  Ken Doherty
130, 111, 100  Martin Gould
128, 115, 104  Liang Wenbo
124, 121  Jimmy Robertson
122, 108, 105, 104  Stuart Bingham
121  Jak Jones
118  Marco Fu
117  Jimmy White
116, 110  Michael White
112  Chen Zhe

111  Liu Song
110, 106  Neil Robertson
110  Bjorn Haneveer
108  Judd Trump
108  James Wattana
106  Shaun Murphy
105  Ricky Walden
102  Liu Chuang
102  Martin O'Donnell
102  Ben Woollaston
101  Alfie Burden
101  Peter Ebdon
100, 100  Stephen Maguire

Notes

Stevens retired due to illness.

References

External links

3 Euro
2010 in German sport

sv:Euro Players Tour Championship 2010/2011#Euro Players Tour Championship 3